Vexillum siciliai is a species of sea snail, a marine gastropod mollusk, in the family Costellariidae, the ribbed miters.

Distribution
This marine species occurs off the Palau Islands.

References

Salisbury, R. A. & Gori, S. (2019). Notes on a collection of Costellariidae from Palau Islands with descriptions of two new species (Gastropoda: Costellariidae). Acta Conchyliorum. 18: 7-20.

siciliai
Gastropods described in 2019